Lemon Creek can refer to:

Lemon Creek, British Columbia, Canada, a village in the Slocan Valley
Lemon Creek, Juneau, Alaska, USA, a neighborhood, noted for its state prison
Lemon Creek (Alaska), USA, a waterway 
Lemon Creek (St. Joseph River tributary), a stream in Michigan
Lemon Creek (Staten Island), New York, a stream